Kristie-Anne Ryder (born 9 March 1990 in Brisbane, Queensland) is an Australian judoka, who played for the half-lightweight category. She is a multiple-time Australian junior champion, and a member of the judo team for Zillmere Police Citizens Youth Club (PCYC), under her personal coach Patrick Mahon.

Ryder represented Australia at the 2008 Summer Olympics in Beijing, where she competed for the women's half-lightweight class (52 kg). She received a bye for the second preliminary round match, before losing out to Belgian judoka and Olympic bronze medalist Ilse Heylen, by an ippon (full point), and a deashi harai (advanced foot sweep), at one minute and thirteen seconds.

References

External links
Profile – Australian Olympic Team

NBC Olympics Profile

Australian female judoka
Living people
Olympic judoka of Australia
Judoka at the 2008 Summer Olympics
Sportswomen from Queensland
1990 births
Sportspeople from Brisbane
20th-century Australian women
21st-century Australian women